The Footloose Heiress is a 1937 American comedy film directed by William Clemens and written by Robertson White. The film stars Craig Reynolds, Ann Sheridan, Anne Nagel, William Hopper, Hugh O'Connell and Teddy Hart. The film was released by Warner Bros. on August 21, 1937.

Plot
Kay Allyn (Ann Sheridan) is the spoiled daughter of eccentric advertising tycoon John C. Allyn (Hugh O'Connell). To win a $5,000 bet with a friend, Kay must wed society boy Jack Pierson (William Hopper) before midnight on her 18th birthday. As Jack has no means of supporting himself, her father is not impressed, and tries to foil his daughter's plans with the aid of hobo Bruce 'Butch' Baeder (Craig Reynolds). Taking a shine to the young man, the tycoon creates a job for him as a radio copy man, and Kay eventually falls for him. An added attraction is that hobo Bruce turns out to be the son of a famous Boston advertising millionaire.

Cast         
 Craig Reynolds as Bruce 'Butch' Baeder
 Ann Sheridan as Kay Allyn
 Anne Nagel as Linda Pierson
 William Hopper as Jack Pierson
 Hugh O'Connell as John C. Allyn
 Teddy Hart as Charlie McCarthy
 Hal Neiman as Luke Peaneather
 Frank Orth as Justice Abner Cuttler 
 William Eberhardt as Wilbur Frost
 Loia Cheaney as Sarah Cuttler

Critical reception
Allmovie wrote, "a few broad swipes at radio advertising aside, Footloose Heiress is as predictable as sunrise and sunset"; while Leonard Maltin wrote, "pretty funny screwball comedy bubbles along at a dizzy pace."

References

External links 
 
 
 
 

1937 films
Warner Bros. films
American comedy films
1937 comedy films
Films directed by William Clemens
American black-and-white films
1930s English-language films
1930s American films